Fly Blue Crane, was a South African regional airline based in Johannesburg, with its hub at O. R. Tambo International Airport, Johannesburg, South Africa.  The company slogan is A fresh approach.

History 
The airline started services on 1 September 2015 and was initially using two Embraer ERJ 145 aircraft on services between Johannesburg, Bloemfontein, Kimberley and Nelspruit.  In late 2016 Fly Blue Crane entered business rescue and on 3 February 2017, the airline announced that they had to discontinue flights indefinitely as they restructure their operations.  Flights have not resumed since, and their website is inoperative.

Destinations 
Fly Blue Crane flew to the following destinations before, on 3 February 2017, the airline announced that it had cancelled all flights 'as part of a business rescue plan':

Fleet 

Fly Blue Crane operated the following aircraft as of August 2016:

References

External links 

 

Defunct airlines of South Africa
Airlines disestablished in 2017
Companies based in Johannesburg
South African brands